Eva Jare (born 6 July 1947) is a Finnish former women's footballer, who made 15 appearances for the Finland women's national football team. In her club career, she played for Lahti-69, Tampere, FC Ilves, and FC Kuusysi. In 2009, she won the  award.

References

Finnish women's footballers
1947 births
Living people
Women's association footballers not categorized by position